The Rapture of Metals (later released as New Maps of Hell II) is the fourth album by composer Paul Schütze, released in 1993 through SDV Tonträger.

Track listing

Personnel 
Denis Blackham – mastering
Frazer Henry – engineering
Paul Schütze – instruments, production
Jörg Willich – design

References

External links 
 

1993 albums
Big Cat Records albums
Paul Schütze albums
Albums produced by Paul Schütze